Nassim also transliterated as Nacim, Naseem, Nasseem, Nasim, Nesim or Nessim, is a unisex Arabic name. It is mostly used in Middle Eastern and South Asian cultures and language groups. It may refer to:

Company
Nasim Sdn Bhd, a member of Naza Group of Companies

People

Men

Nacim
Nacim Abdelali (born 1981), Algerian footballer

Naseem
Mohamed Tawfik Naseem Pasha (1871–1938), Egyptian politician
Naseem Hijazi (c. 1910–1996), Pakistani Urdu writer
Mohammad Naseem (1924–2014), Pakistani-British doctor and politician
Naseem Kharal (1939–1978), Pakistani short story writer
Farogh Naseem (born 1969), Pakistani lawyer
Naseem Hamed (born 1974), Yemeni-British boxer
Hassan Evan Naseem (1984–2003), Maldivian drug offender killed in jail
Naqeebullah Mehsud (1991–2018), also known as "Naseem Ullah", a Pakistani national ethnic Pashtun who was killed in a fake police encounter

Nasim
Anwar Nasim (born 1935), Pakistani nuclear scientist and molecular biologist
Daya Shankar Kaul Nasim (1811–1845), Urdu poet
Nasim Amrohvi (1908–1987), Pakistani Urdu poet
Nasim Ashraf, Pakistani politician and cricket administrator
Nasim Hasan Shah (1929–2015), Pakistani judge
Nasim Khaksar (born 1933), Iranian writer
Nasim al-Safarjalani (1935–1994), Syrian politician
Nasim-ul-Ghani (born 1941), Pakistani cricketer
Mohammad Nasim (Guantanamo captive 958) (born 1962), Afghan detainee
Nasim Nisr (born 1968), Lebanese-Israeli convicted of spying
Nasim Khan (cricketer, born 1976) (born 1976), Pakistani cricketer
Mohammad Nasim Akhundzada (died 1990), Afghan warlord
Lieutenant General Abu Saleh Mohammad Nasim, former Chief of Army Staff, Bangladesh Army
Nasim Ahmed (cricketer), Pakistani cricketer
Nasim Fekrat, Afghan journalist
Nasim Ur Rehman, Pakistani politician
Mohammed Nasim (1948–2020), Bangladesh politician

Nasimuddin
Nasimuddin Amin (1955–2008), Malaysian businessman

Nassim
Nassim Maalouf (born 1941). Lebanese trumpeter
Nassim Soleimanpour (born 1981), writer from Iran (White Rabbit Red Rabbit)
Nassim Nicholas Taleb (born 1960), Lebanese-American businessman and academic
Nassim Akrour (born 1974), Algerian footballer
Nassim Mendil (born 1979), Algerian-French footballer
Nassim Hamlaoui (born 1981), Algerian footballer
Nassim Oussalah (born 1981), Algerian footballer
Nassim Dehouche (born 1982), Algerian footballer
Nassim Banouas (born 1986), Algerian-German footballer
Nassim Boukmacha (born 1987), Algerian footballer
Nassim Oudahmane (born 1987), Algerian footballer
Nassim Ben Khalifa (born 1992), Tunisian-Swiss footballer

Nesim
Nesim Özgür (born 1973), Turkish-Bulgarian  footballer
Nesim Tahirović (born 1941), Bosnian painter
Nesim Turan (born 1992), Turkish Paralympian table tennis player

Women

Naseem
Naseem Begum (1936–1971), Pakistani singer
Naseem Banu (1916–2002), Indian cinema actress
Naseem Hameed (born 1988), Pakistani athlete
Naz Shah (born Naseem Shah; 1973), British Labour Party politician

Nasim
Nasim Pedrad (born 1981), Iranian-American actress and comedian
Nasim Wali Khan, Pakistani politician
Nasim Zehra (born 1953), Pakistani journalist

Fictional characters 
Naseem, fictional character played by Wasim Nawaz in the web series Corner Shop Show
Nacim Bismilla, fictional character on the HBO drama Oz, played by Ra Hanna
Naseem Ali Khan, fictional character on the British drama Indian Summers, played by Tanmay Dhanania

Other uses
Nasim (car), Iranian car
Naseem (film), 1995 Hindi film
Nassim al-Roh, 1998 Syrian film
Naseem Cup, Yemeni football competition, 2000–2003
NASSIM, an Off-Broadway play by Iranian playwright Nassim Soleimanpour

Arabic masculine given names
Arabic feminine given names
Arabic unisex given names
Turkish masculine given names